Cetara is a town and comune in the province of Salerno in the Campania region of south-western Italy. It is located in the territory of the Amalfi Coast.

History
The village was originally a settlement for a group of armed Muslims in 880. Characterized to be a village of fishermen (especially of tuna), its name take origins probably from the Latin word Cetaria (in Greek Ketèia), meaning almadraba (in Italian tonnara); or cetari, meaning fishmongers of big fishes.

Geography
Cetara is located by the Tyrrhenian Sea, on the Amalfi Drive road between the "Marina" of Albori and Erchie, bordering with the municipalities of Vietri sul Mare and Maiori. Its municipalities is extended from the coast to the Mount Falerio and counts only one civil parish (frazione): the little village of Fuenti, situated on the hills close to the Amalfi Drive.

See also 
 Amalfi Coast
 Sorrentine Peninsula

References

External links

 Official site of Cetara 
 Practical Guide Cetara

Cities and towns in Campania
Amalfi Coast
Coastal towns in Campania